Gary Mandy (born 20 October 1959) is a Zimbabwean former cyclist. He competed in two events at the 1988 Summer Olympics.

References

External links
 

1959 births
Living people
Zimbabwean male cyclists
Olympic cyclists of Zimbabwe
Cyclists at the 1988 Summer Olympics
Commonwealth Games competitors for Zimbabwe
Cyclists at the 1990 Commonwealth Games
Place of birth missing (living people)